Peter Daniell (1584–1652) was an English politician who sat in the House of Commons in 1626.

Daniell originated in Over Tabley, Cheshire. He matriculated at Queen's College, Oxford on 16 October 1601, aged 17. He was a student of Gray's Inn in 1604. In 1626, he was elected Member of Parliament for Cheshire.

References

1584 births
1652 deaths
English MPs 1626
Alumni of The Queen's College, Oxford
Members of Gray's Inn
Place of birth missing